The following is a list of international organization leaders in 2013.

UN organizations

Political and economic organizations

Financial organizations

Sports organizations

Other organizations

See also
List of state leaders in 2013
List of religious leaders in 2013
List of international organization leaders in 2012
List of international organization leaders in 2014

References

2013
2013 in international relations
Lists of office-holders in 2013